Pierre Delaunay (9 October 1919 – 23 January 2019) was the second General Secretary of UEFA. He succeeded his father Henri Delaunay in the post, on an interim basis from his father's death on 9 November 1955 and then officially from 8 June 1956. He died in Versailles on 23 January 2019, aged 99.

References

UEFA website

1919 births
2019 deaths
Association football executives
UEFA officials